Tayla Harris (born 16 April 1997) is an Australian rules footballer playing for the Melbourne Football Club in the AFL Women's (AFLW) and professional boxer.

Early life and amateur career
Harris was born and raised in Brisbane's northern suburbs and began playing competitive football for Aspley at age five. She played in a mixed competition with young girls and boys until 2010.

At the age of 15, she began playing senior football for Zillmere in the AFL Queensland Women's League (QAWFL), where she won the league best and fairest award in her first season. In 2017, following a move to Melbourne, she began playing in the VFL Women's competition with the St Kilda Sharks.

She represented Queensland in the youth girls competition, and is a five time All-Australian.

At the age of 17, she was drafted to the  representative side as part of the AFL women's exhibition series. She continued to play for the club through 2016. She also played as part of the ' representative team in 2016.

She attended primary school at Prince of Peace Lutheran College and high school at Albany Creek State High School.

AFL Women's career

She made her league debut in the club's inaugural match, in round 1, 2017, against  at Casey Fields. In round 2, she was nominated for the league Rising Star award for a two-goal, twelve disposal and seven mark performance against , and also was named "Player of the Week" by the AFL Players Association. At the conclusion of two rounds she was ranked equal fourth in the league for total goals scored (two) and first in the league for contested marks (eight).

At the end of the season, Harris was listed in the 2017 All-Australian team.

Prior to the 2017 AFLW trade period, Harris expressed her desire to be traded to a Victorian club. The trade period started on 15 May. Early talks between Brisbane and  faltered; although Carlton offered Bianca Jakobsson in trade, Brisbane wanted an additional player.  also made an offer for Harris.

She played six matches with her new club in 2018 and kicked five goals, tying with Darcy Vescio to share the club's leading goalkicker award with them. She also claimed All-Australian selection that year, named on the interchange bench. Her 2019 and 2020 seasons were both solid, as she kicked 8 goals in each. She was named in the All-Australian team in 2020 on the interchange bench. 2021 saw Harris down on form, playing 9 games but only kicking 4 goals and averaging under 10 disposals. Harris was involved in controversy in March 2021 after it was reported that she missed part of her training in order to create an instagram post promoting her new documentary. Harris cautioned that she may switch sporting codes back to boxing, where she was successful in the past. It was reported that her relationship with the club had begun to deteriorate.

AFLW statistics
Statistics are correct to the end of the 2022 season.

|-
! scope="row" style="text-align:center" | 2017
|style="text-align:center;"|
| 7 || 8 || 4 || 9 || 45 || 11 || 56 || 23 || 16 || 0.5 || 1.1 || 5.6 || 1.4 || 7.0 || 2.9 || 2.0 || 6
|- style="background-color: #eaeaea"
! scope="row" style="text-align:center" | 2018
|style="text-align:center;"|
| 22 || 6 || 5 || 6 || 48 || 11 || 59 || 20 || 19 || 0.8 || 1.0 || 8.0 || 1.8 || 9.8 || 3.3 || 3.2 || 4
|-
! scope="row" style="text-align:center" | 2019
|style="text-align:center;"|
| 7 || 8 || 8 || 7 || 50 || 13 || 63 || 25 || 21 || 1.0 || 0.9 || 6.3 || 1.6 || 7.9 || 3.1 || 2.6 || 0
|- style="background-color: #eaeaea"
! scope="row" style="text-align:center" | 2020
|style="text-align:center;"|
| 7 || 7 || 8 || 5 || 55 || 18 || 73 || 26 || 17 || 1.1 || 0.7 || 7.9 || 2.6 || 10.5 || 3.7 || 2.4 || 3
|-
! scope="row" style="text-align:center" | 2021
|style="text-align:center;"|
| 7 || 9 || 4 || 3 || 34 || 14 || 48 || 16 || 17 || 0.5 || 0.3 || 4.3 || 1.8 || 6.0 || 2.0 || 2.1 || 0
|-
! scope="row" style="text-align:center" | 2022
|style="text-align:center;"|
| 7 || 12 || 18 || 11 || 66 || 31 || 97 || 39 || 17 || 1.5 || 0.9 || 5.5 || 2.6 || 8.1 || 3.3 || 1.4 || 3
|- class="sortbottom"
! colspan=3| Career
! 49
! 47
! 40
! 298
! 98
! 396
! 149
! 107
! 1.0
! 0.8
! 6.1
! 2.0
! 8.1
! 3.0
! 2.2
! 13
|}

Professional boxing record

Online harassment

A picture taken by AFL Media photographer Michael Willson showing Harris kicking for goal during a 2019 match against the Western Bulldogs became the target of sexual Internet trolling after it was posted on social media by Seven Network.  Harris retweeted the photograph with the caption: "Here’s a pic of me at work... think about this before your derogatory comments, animals".  Critics of the trolls included fellow AFLW players Erin Phillips and Darcy Vescio, Geelong player Patrick Dangerfield, cyclist Anna Meares, AFLW head of football Nicole Livingstone and Australian Football League chief executive Gillon McLachlan, and federal minister for women Kelly O'Dwyer. Phillips, Vescio, Meares and O'Dwyer joined the chorus of people condemning Seven's decision to remove the photo, which was perceived as yielding to the trolls. It was later reinstated with an apology.

On 11 September 2019, a bronze statue immortalising the image was unveiled in Federation Square Melbourne.

On 27 February 2020, Tayla Harris was announced as an ambassador for Our Watch, a national organisation tasked with preventing violence against women and their children.

Personal life
Harris' partner is fellow AFLW player Kodi Jacques.

Recognition
She was recognized as one of the BBC's 100 women of 2019.

See also

 List of Australian rules football statues

References

External links

1997 births
Living people
Sportspeople from Brisbane
Sportswomen from Queensland
Australian rules footballers from Queensland
Brisbane Lions (AFLW) players
Carlton Football Club (AFLW) players
All-Australians (AFL Women's)
Australian women boxers
Middleweight boxers
BBC 100 Women
Lesbian sportswomen
Australian LGBT sportspeople
LGBT players of Australian rules football
Melbourne Football Club (AFLW) players
21st-century LGBT people